Bukalo is a village in Namibia. It is situated in the Zambezi Region 43 kilometres away from the region’s capital, Katima Mulilo. It is also the Royal Headquarters of the Subia people. In 2013, it was upgraded from a settlement to a village with its own village council by the former President of Namibia, Hifikepunye Pohamba.

Name
The name Bukalo is from the word Buikalo which simply means ‘Settlement’ in the Ikuhane language (Chikuhane).

History
The Subia are a Bantu speaking ethnic group that migrated southward of Africa. One group went to Zambia and another to Botswana. King Mutwa Liswani II (1965 – 1996) set his palace up in present day Bukalo and established the Subia Royal Headquarters there.

Politics
In 2013 it was proclaimed village by the former President of Namibia, Hifikepunye Pohamba. Bukalo is governed by the Bukalo Village Council which is the local authority responsible for its administration. It has five seats, headed by a chief executive officer, a chairperson and a deputy chairperson who reports to Councillors elected by the people in an election. During the 2020 Local Authority Elections, the SWAPO party obtained 209 votes and gained three seats, and the PDM party received 94 votes and gained two seats.

References

Villages in Namibia